Björn Dawidsson (born June 7 1949 in Örebro), who publishes as Dawid, is a Swedish photographer based in Stockholm.

Biography
In 1973 he Dawidsson had his first big solo exhibition Ingen älskar mig (Nobody Loves Me) at Liljevalchs konsthall in Stockholm with a selection of 50 small camera prints from 35mm negatives.  

The Rost series marked a fundamental shift away from both the style of his previous images and the parameters of 'straight' representational photography. 

Dawidsson has been exhibited in many national and international museums and galleries and is represented in a number of significant art collections.

Solo exhibitions (selection) 
 Swedish Photography, Berlin, Germany), 2013 
 Landskrona Museum, (Landskrona, Sweden), 2012
 Swedish Photography, Berlin, Germany), 2011
 Fotografiska, (Stockholm, Sweden), 2010 and 2011
 Nordic Light, (Kristiansund, Norway), 2010
 Hasselblad Center, (Gothenburg, Sweden), 2009
 Skövde Museum, (Skövde, Sweden), 2008
 Liljevalchs Konsthall, (Stockholm, Sweden), 2008
 Millesgårdens Konsthall, Stockholm, Sweden), 2005 
 Centre Culturel Suédois, (Paris, France), 2002
 The Pentagram Gallery, (London, UK), 2001
 Galerie Priska Pasquer, (Cologne, Germany), 2001
 Galerie 213, Retrospective of large format works, (Paris, France) 1999 
 Karlshamns Konsthall, Retrospective, (Karlshamn, Sweden), 1997
 Galleri Krister Fahl, (Stockholm, Sweden). 1994 (
 Folkwang Museum (Essen, Germany), M + M, large format works, 1993
 Malmö Konsthall (Malmö, Sweden) (DAGRAMS), photograms, 1989
 Centre Culturel Suédois, (Paris, France), 1986
 Upplandsmuseet, (Uppsala, Sweden), 1985
 Moderna Museet, “Rost” (Stockholm, Sweden) 1983 
 Galleri Camera Obscura, (Stockholm, Sweden), 1980
 Liljevalchs Konsthall, “Ingen älskar mig”(Stockholm, Sweden) 1973

Books/Monographs (selection)
 Kars, 2011
 Hybris, Liljevalchs Konsthall (text Niclas Östlind), 2008
 Beautiful Frames, Steidl (Editor Michael Mack), 2001
 Mot fotografiet/Arbetsnamn Skulptur (Working Title: Sculpture), by Linde, Ulf, Carlsson Bokförlag, 1989
 Verkligen?!, by Dawid and Lind, Håkan, Bokförlaget, 1978, (reissued  2009, (text Niclas Östlind)

Collections
 Absolut Art Collection
 Bonnier Collection, Stockholm, Sweden
 Camera Obscura Collection, Stockholm, Sweden
 Centro Cultural Arte Contemporaneo, Mexico City, Mexico
 Dorint Collection, Brussels, Belgium
 Erling Neby Collection, Norway
 Folkwang Museum, Essen
 Göteborgs Konstmuseum, Gothenburg, Sweden
 Helsingborg Konstmuseum, Sweden
 Kalmar Konstmuseum, Kalmar, Sweden
 Landskrona Museum, Landskrona, Sweden
 Malmö Museum, Malmö, Sweden
 Manfred Heiting Collection, Amsterdam, Netherlands
 Moderna Museet, Stockholm, Sweden
 Museet för samtidskunst, Oslo, Norway
 Nyky taiteen museo, Helsinki, Finland
 Rogaland Kunstmuseum, Stavanger, Norway
 The Hasselblad Collection, Gothenburg, Sweden
 The National Public Art Council, Sweden
 Upplands Konstmuseum, Uppsala, Sweden
 Örebro Läns Landsting, Sweden

References

1949 births
Living people
Swedish photographers
Place of birth missing (living people)